Michael Duignan may refer to:

 Michael Duignan (hurler) (born 1968), Irish former GAA player and current chairman of the Offaly County Board
 Michael Duignan (bishop) (born 1970), Irish Irish Roman Catholic prelate, current Bishop of Clonfert and Galway and Kilmacduagh